Sunil Kumar Mondal is an Indian politician and was a member of parliament to the 16th Lok Sabha from Bardhaman Purba (Lok Sabha constituency), West Bengal. He won the 2014 Indian general election being an All India Trinamool Congress candidate.

While still a Forward Bloc MLA from Galsi (Vidhan Sabha constituency) he had voted for the Trinamool Congress candidate during the Rajya Sabha election in February 2014. Subsequently, he joined the Trinamool Congress.

On 19 December 2020, he joined the Bharatiya Janata Party. But after TMC's thumping victory in 2021 election he declared that he was "always with the TMC".

References

India MPs 2014–2019
Living people
1958 births
People from Purba Bardhaman district
Lok Sabha members from West Bengal
India MPs 2019–present
Bharatiya Janata Party politicians from West Bengal